Ramón Otoniel Olivas Ruiz (born 28 February 1968) is a retired Nicaraguan footballer and currently football manager.

He now coaches  Real Estelí in the Primera División de Nicaragua,

Club career
During his career he  played for Real Estelí for whom he scored 62 goals in 16 years  in Nicaragua, Atlético Indio in Honduras and Atlético Marte in El Salvador. He is considered one of the best central defenders to have played in and for Nicaragua.

International career
Olivas made his debut for Nicaragua in a July 1992 FIFA World Cup qualification match against El Salvador and has earned a total of 11 caps, scoring no goals. He has represented his country in 4 FIFA World Cup qualification matches and played at the 1993, 1995, 1997 and 1999 UNCAF Nations Cups.

His final international was a March 1999 UNCAF Nations Cup match against El Salvador.

Managerial career
Olivas has managed Real Estelí since 2003, but was appointed national team manager for the 2009 UNCAF Nations Cup.

Titles

Personal life
His brother, Samuel Olivas, also played for the national team.

References

External links
 Profile - Real Esteli 

1968 births
Living people
People from Estelí Department
Association football defenders
Nicaraguan men's footballers
Nicaragua international footballers
Real Estelí F.C. players
Nicaraguan expatriate footballers
Expatriate footballers in Honduras
Nicaraguan football managers
Real Estelí F.C. managers
Nicaragua national football team managers